Chalabeh-ye Sofla (also Romanized as Chālābeh-ye Soflá; also known as Chālāb-e Soflá and Godār) is a village in Mahidasht Rural District, Mahidasht District, Kermanshah County, Kermanshah Province, Iran. At the 2006 census, its population was 185, in 45 families.

References 

Populated places in Kermanshah County